Intersection is a 1994 film, directed by Mark Rydell, and starring Richard Gere, Sharon Stone, Lolita Davidovich and Martin Landau. It is a remake of the French film Les choses de la vie (1970) by Claude Sautet, the story — both filmed and set in Vancouver, British Columbia — concerns an architect (played by Gere) who, as his classic Mercedes 280SL roadster hurtles into a collision at an intersection, flashes through key moments in his life, including his marriage to a beautiful but chilly heiress (Stone) and his subsequent affair with a travel writer (Davidovich).

Plot 
Vincent Eastman and his wife, Sally, run an architectural firm together. He is the architect and creative director while Sally handles the firm's business end. Unhappy in his marriage to Sally, with whom he has a daughter, Vincent considers his relationship more of a business than a family.

Vincent encounters a journalist, Olivia Marshak at an antique auction and a romantic spark ignites between them. They begin seeing each other whenever possible. After a quarrel with Sally at home, Vincent moves out but is still torn between his marriage and the possibility of a future with Olivia.

At first, deciding that the best course of action for everyone is for him to remain in his unhappy marriage, Vincent writes a letter to Olivia explaining that he is going back to his wife.  Before he can mail it, he stops at a convenience store in the country and sees a little girl who reminds him of Olivia.  Realizing his true feelings for Olivia, Vincent calls her and leaves a message on her answering machine, telling Olivia that he loves her, wants to start a life with her and that he's certain about his choice.

While speeding back to the city to be with Olivia, Vincent is in a car accident which results in his death. At the hospital, Sally receives Vincent's belongings and finds the letter to Olivia. When Olivia shows up at the hospital, Sally does not tell Olivia about the letter; in turn, Olivia does not tell Sally about the message that Vincent left for her.

The women part ways, each believing that she was Vincent's true love.

Cast 
 Richard Gere as Vincent Eastman
 Sharon Stone as Sally Eastman
 Lolita Davidovich as Olivia Marshak
 Martin Landau as Neal
 David Selby as Richard Quarry
 Jennifer Morrison as Meaghan Eastman (as Jenny Morrison)
 Veena Sood as Intern

Reception 
The film received poor reviews from critics, with Rotten Tomatoes holding this film with a 9% rating based on 32 reviews. Audiences surveyed by CinemaScore gave the film a grade "C+" on scale of A to F. It also won Sharon Stone a Golden Raspberry Award and a Stinker award for Worst Actress for her performance in the film (also for The Specialist).

Box office 
The film opened at number 3 at the US box office on its opening weekend behind Mrs. Doubtfire and Philadelphia, and went on to gross $21.3 million in the US and Canada. It grossed $40 million overseas for a worldwide gross of $61.3 million against a $45 million budget.

Year-end lists 
 9th worst – Dan Craft, The Pantagraph
 Top 10 worst (not ranked) – Dan Webster, The Spokesman-Review
Dishonorable mention – Glenn Lovell, San Jose Mercury News

References

External links 
 
 
 

1994 films
1994 drama films
American drama films
American remakes of French films
1990s English-language films
Films scored by James Newton Howard
Films directed by Mark Rydell
Films set in Vancouver
Films shot in Vancouver
Paramount Pictures films
Films with screenplays by Marshall Brickman
Golden Raspberry Award winning films
1990s American films